*Ḱérberos (Proto-Indo-European for "spotted") is the reconstructed name of the canine creature guarding the entrance to the Otherworld in Proto-Indo-European mythology. In a recurrent motif, the Otherworld contains a gate, generally guarded by a dog who could also serve as a guide and ensured that the ones who entered could not get out.

Name 
The Greek Cerberus and the Hindu Śárvara likely derive from the common Proto-Indo-European noun *Ḱérberos ("spotted"). Historian Bruce Lincoln has proposed a third cognate in the Norse Garmr, although this has been debated as linguistically untenable.

Overview 
The motif of a canine guardian of the entrance to the Otherworld is attested in Persian mythology, where two four-eyed dogs guard the Chinvat Bridge, a bridge that marks the threshold between the world of the living and the world of the dead. The Videvdat (Vendidad) 13,9 describes them as 'spâna pəšu.pâna' ("two bridge-guarding dogs"). A parallel imagery is found in Historical Vedic religion: Yama, ruler of the underworld realm, is said to own two four-eyed dogs who also act as his messengers and fulfill the role of protectors of the soul in the path to heaven. These hounds, named Shyama (Śyāma) and Sabala, are described as the brood of Sarama, a divine female dog: one is black and the other spotted.

Slovene deity and hero Kresnik is also associated with a four-eyed dog, and a similar figure in folk belief (a canine with white or brown spots above its eyes - thus, "four-eyed") is said to be able to sense the approach of death.

In Nordic mythology, a dog stands on the road to Hel; it is often assumed to be identical with Garmr, the howling hound bound at the entrance to Gnipahellir. In Albanian folklore, a never-sleeping three-headed dog is also said to live in the world of the dead. Another parallel may be found in the Cŵn Annwn ("Hounds of Annwn"), creatures of Welsh mythology said to live in Annwn, a name for the Welsh Otherworld. They are described as hell hounds or spectral dogs that take part in the Wild Hunt, chasing after the dead and pursuing the souls of men.

Remains of dogs found in grave sites of the Iron Age Wielbark culture, and dog burials of Early Medieval North-Western Slavs (in Pomerania) would suggest the longevity of the belief. Another dog-burial in Góra Chełmska and a Pomeranian legend about a canine figure associated with the otherworld seem to indicate the existence of the motif in Slavic tradition.

In a legend from Lokev, a male creature named Vilež ("fairy man"), who dwells in Vilenica Cave, is guarded by two wolves and is said to take men into the underworld. Belarusian scholar Siarhiej Sanko suggests that characters in a Belarusian ethnogenetic myth, Prince Bai and his two dogs, Staury and Gaury (Haury), are related to Vedic Yama and his two dogs. To him, Gaury is connected to Lithuanian gaurai 'mane, shaggy (of hair)'.

An archeological find by Russian archeologist Alexei Rezepkin at Tsarskaya showed two dogs of different colors (one of bronze, the other of silver), each siding the porthole of a tomb. This imagery seemed to recall the Indo-Aryan myth of Yama and his dogs.

Other mythologies 
The mytheme possibly stems from an older Ancient North Eurasian belief, as evidenced by similar motifs in Native American and Siberian mythology, in which case it might be one of the oldest mythemes recoverable through comparative mythology. The King of the Otherworld may have been Yemo, the sacrificed twin of the creation myth, as suggested by the Indo-Iranian and, to a lesser extent, by the Germanic, Greek and Celtic traditions.

Notes

References

Bibliography

 

 
 

Mythological canines
Proto-Indo-European mythology